Xagar can refer to:

Xagar (Tibet), a village in Tibet
Xagar District, a district in Somalia